The European Liberation Front (ELF) was a neo-Nazi, pan-European nationalist group that split from Oswald Mosley's fascist Union Movement in 1948. Its founder was Francis Parker Yockey. It issued a manifesto called The Proclamation of London, written by Yockey. It lasted until 1954.

References

 Bibliography
 
 
 SPLC: Third Position On The Web   

Neo-fascist organizations
National Bolshevik parties
Nationalist organizations
Neo-fascist parties
Organizations established in 1948
Pan-European nationalism
Pan-nationalism
Neo-Nazi organizations
Neo-Nazi organisations in the United Kingdom